Bedovy was the lead ship of the  of the Soviet Navy.

Construction and career
The ship was built at Zhdanov Shipyard in Leningrad and was launched on 31 July 1955 and commissioned on 30 June 1958.

On May 19, 1966, she was reclassified into a Large Missile Ship (DBK), on January 26, 1973 - into a Large Anti-Submarine Ship (BOD), and on June 26, 1977, it was again returned to the DBK.

In the period from October 7, 1970 to July 15, 1971, she performed combat missions to provide assistance to the Egyptian armed forces.

In the period from July 18, 1972 to January 25, 1974, she was modernized at the Sevmorzavod, Sevastopol according to the Project 56-U. Subsequently, from April 23, 1981 to May 14, 1984, a major overhaul was also carried out there.

After modernization in 1974, she served in the Mediterranean, where she was responsible for the surveillance of the aircraft carriers USS Franklin D. Roosevelt, Forrestal and Saratoga. On August 30, 1974, together with Soznatelny, Komsomolets Ukrainy and Beshtau, took part in the rescue operations of Otvazhny in the Black Sea.

From 10 to 21 April 1975, she took part in the exercises Okean-75. May 15 - June 13, 1984 took part in the Okean-84 exercise in the Mediterranean Sea (the topic of the exercise: "he defeat of the enemy's AMG OS RUS in cooperation with the Black Sea Fleet Air Force MRA). The exercises were also attended by Zhdanov, Komsomolets Ukrainy, Sderzhanny, Stroyny, Udaloy, Nakhodchivy, Soznatelny, Neulovimy, Silny, Druzhny, Volk, Zarnitsa, K-298, Kildin, Desna, etc.

April 25, 1989, she was disarmed and expelled from the Navy in connection with the transfer to the OFI for dismantling and implementation. On August 5 of the same year, she was sold to a private Turkish company for dismantling.

References

Ships built at Severnaya Verf
Kildin-class destroyers
1955 ships
Cold War destroyers of the Soviet Union